A Lovesome Thing is an album by saxophonist Frank Morgan which was recorded in 1990 and released on the Antilles label the following year.

Reception

The review by Allmusic's Scott Yanow said: "There are no barnburners on the date but overall the music is rewarding".

Track listing 
 "When You Wish Upon a Star" (Leigh Harline, Ned Washington) – 2:05
 "Footprints" (Wayne Shorter) – 7:00
 "Ten Cents a Dance" (Richard Rodgers, Lorenz Hart) – 5:25
 "Everything Happens to Me" (Matt Dennis, Tom Adair) – 7:05
 "Helen's Song" (George Cables) – 6:29
 "Pannonica" (Thelonious Monk) – 9:11
 "Wholey Earth" (Abbey Lincoln) – 5:17
 "A Flower Is a Lovesome Thing" (Billy Strayhorn) – 7:20
 "Lullaby" (Cables) – 4:40

Personnel

Performance
Frank Morgan – alto saxophone, soprano saxophone
George Cables – piano 
David Williams – bass
Lewis Nash – drums
Roy Hargrove – trumpet (tracks 2, 4 & 5)
Abbey Lincoln – vocals (tracks 3 & 7)

Production
John Snyder – producer
Jay Newland, Joe Lopes – engineer

References 

Frank Morgan (musician) albums
1991 albums
Antilles Records albums